Elachista microdigitata is a moth in the family Elachistidae. It was described by Parenti in 1983. It is found in Japan (Hokkaidô, Honsyû) and south-eastern Siberia.

The length of the forewings is 3.4–4 mm for males and 3.7–4.3 mm for females. The forewings are dark grey-brownish, mottled with paler bases of scales and with sexually dimorphic whitish markings, which are much more distinct in females. Adults have been recorded on wing from late June to mid July, probably in one generation per year.

References

Moths described in 1983
microdigitata
Moths of Asia